Jane Bryan (born Jane O'Brien, June 11, 1918 – April 8, 2009) was an American actress groomed by Warner Bros. to become one of its leading ladies but she chose to retire from acting in 1940 at age 22, after which she became a philanthropist and arts patron.

Early years
Born in Hollywood, California,  Bryan was the daughter of Mr. and Mrs. James O'Brien. Her father was an attorney. Her first dramatic training came in Jean Muir's theatrical workshop, where she was discovered by Bette Davis.

Career 
Bryan gained acting experience as an apprentice at the Hollywood Theatre Workshop. Her film debut came in The Case of the Black Cat (1936).

Her screen career lasted only four years, but she appeared in prominent roles in several memorable films, including Marked Woman (1937) with Davis and Humphrey Bogart; Kid Galahad (1937) with Edward G. Robinson, Davis, and Bogart; A Slight Case of Murder (1938) with Robinson; Each Dawn I Die (1939) with James Cagney and George Raft; Invisible Stripes (1939) with Raft, William Holden, and Bogart; and The Old Maid (1939) with Davis and Miriam Hopkins. Bryan's first leading role was in We Are Not Alone (1939). Associated Press writer Robbin Coons described her work in that film as "a heart-touching performance in which sincerity and truth are radiant factors."

Marriage
Bryan married businessman and entrepreneur Justin Dart on New Year's Eve, 1939. They were married until his death in 1984. Dart took control of the United Drug Company in 1943, and rebranded the stores under the Rexall Drug name.

The Darts were staunch Republicans and helped persuade their personal friend, former California governor Ronald Reagan, to run for president of the United States in 1980.

Public service 
Bryan served on the United States Commission of Fine Arts in Washington, D.C. from 1971 to 1976.

Death
Jane Bryan Dart died at her home on April 8, 2009, aged 90, in Pebble Beach, California, following a lengthy illness. She was survived by her three children; three grandchildren; two great-grandchildren; and two brothers.

She was pre-deceased by her brother Jim O'Brien in 1986. Her stepson Justin Whitlock Dart, Jr., a disability-rights activist, died in 2002.

Filmography

See also
 "The Diary of Jane", song by Breaking Benjamin

References

External links

Obituary

1918 births
2009 deaths
Actresses from Los Angeles
American film actresses
Warner Bros. contract players
20th-century American actresses
People from Pebble Beach, California
California Republicans
21st-century American women